The 2006 WNBA season was the 10th season for the Sacramento Monarchs. The Monarchs reached their second trip to the WNBA Finals, but was defeated in five games to the Detroit Shock. It was the final season in franchise history that Sacramento qualified for the WNBA Finals.

Offseason
Chelsea Newton was picked up by the Chicago Sky in the 2006 WNBA Expansion Draft.

WNBA Draft

Regular season

Season standings

Season schedule

Player stats

References

Sacramento Monarchs seasons
Sacramento
Western Conference (WNBA) championship seasons
Sacramento Monarchs